Orienspterodon ("eastern Pterodon") is an extinct genus of hyainailourid hyaenodonts from paraphyletic subfamily Hyainailourinae that lived in China and Myanmar during the middle to late Eocene. Orienspterodon dahkoensis was originally assigned to genus Pterodon in 1975, but was eventually assigned to its own genus in 2007.

Phylogeny
The phylogenetic relationships of genus Orienspterodon are shown in the following cladogram.

See also
 Mammal classification
 Hyainailourinae

References

Hyaenodonts
Eocene mammals of Asia
Prehistoric placental genera